Robin Casady (died October 5, 2020) was the founder of Casady & Greene, a Macintosh software publisher and developer, in 1984 to publish fonts for the Macintosh 128K, the original Macintosh. After the closure of Casady & Greene, Casady worked with Mike Wright on updating and publishing the iData freeform database. Robin Casady was also involved in design and mfg. of high-end amateur astronomy gear, and pursuing a lifelong hobby in fine arts photography. His personal web page is RobinCasady.com.

References

External links 
 Robin Casady website
 Robin Casady - Casady & Greene closing statement

2020 deaths
Year of birth missing